Sea Rim State Park is a  state park in southeast Texas.
The park is located on the Gulf of Mexico in southern Jefferson County, south of Port Arthur and just west of Sabine Pass. The park was closed for several years due to extensive damage from Hurricanes Rita (2005) and Ike (2008).  The park has recently re-opened but currently has limited resources.

Description

The D. Roy Harrington Beach unit is the coastal portion of the park, offering beach access between the Gulf of Mexico and the mainland marshes. Swimming in the marshes is not permitted due to the presence of alligators.

The Marshlands unit is located in the inland marshes of southern Jefferson County, and is only accessible by boat. The park does rent canoes and kayaks so that these areas of the park may be explored by visitors. Many species of migratory birds stop in or pass through the park, and the Marshlands unit provides observation blinds for bird watchers.

McFaddin National Wildlife Refuge borders the park.

Three nearby national wildlife refuges on the Texas coast - Brazoria N.W.R., San Bernard and Big Boggy - form a vital complex of coastal wetlands harboring more than 300 bird species.

History
The park land was purchased from the Planet Oil and Mineral Corporation and Horizon Sales Corporation in 1972, and opened in 1977.

The portion of Texas State Highway 87 extending through Sea Rim to High Island is closed, having been destroyed in 1989 by Hurricane Jerry. Previous storms had eroded the beach, leaving the highway vulnerable to storm-generated surf.

In September 2005, Hurricane Rita did extensive damage to Sea Rim State Park, forcing its closure. Hurricane Ike caused further damage in 2008.  In April 2010 the park re-opened to limited daytime use.  By June 2014 TPWD had restored services at the park.  The park provides water and electric service to campsites located off of the beach.  Visitors have an option to camp on the beach in primitive campsites.  More detailed information is available on the Texas Parks and Wildlife Division website.

See also
 Anahuac NWR - nearby wildlife refuge to the west.
 List of Texas state parks

References

External links
 
 Sea Rim State Park from the Texas Parks and Wildlife Department.

Protected areas of Jefferson County, Texas
State parks of Texas
Beaches of Texas
Landforms of Jefferson County, Texas